Rasta Kuzma Ramacandra (known professionally as Rasta Thomas) was born on July 18, 1981 in San Francisco and is a dancer, martial artist, gymnast, and choreographer.  Thomas is the founder of the Bad Boys of Dance and director/owner of the ShowBiz National Talent Competition.  Thomas is a past winner of prestigious ballet competitions worldwide and has been a guest with numerous dance companies.

Early life and training
Rasta Thomas was raised in Washington, DC.  His parents—both physicians—traveled widely and took their son with them.  When Thomas was two years old, he broke his leg in a jeep accident, and as a result, began disciplined therapeutic physical training. Thomas' father enrolled the boy in Taekwondo lessons at the age of three.  By the time Thomas was seven, his father felt he was being disrespectful to his teachers and so, as punishment, enrolled him in ballet classes. When Rasta was eight years old, his father signed him up for gymnastics and swimming. In gymnastics, he took private lessons under Jamel Eddin Chaabani, who was the head coach of the Tunisian and Saudi National Olympic Teams.

In swimming and during the same year Rasta won the gold medal in the butterfly stroke during the Saudi Arabia Final in Dahran.

Thomas entered the commercial competition circuit, winning StarQuest, Showbiz, and Star Power dance contests. Over time, he developed aspirations of becoming an action-movie star while working as an étoile, "leading dancer" or star,  in the Paris Opera House.

Early career and continued training
Thomas received his dance training from the age of twelve at The Kirov Academy of Ballet, in Washington, D.C., and also studied at the Washington School of Ballet. Thomas' father would take his son to see many ballet companies perform at the Kennedy Center for the Arts. His father would then ask dancers if they would grant his son classes, and they often obliged.  At age thirteen, Thomas trained under Dawei Zhang at the Maryland Youth Ballet; of Zhang, Thomas said "The technique I learned from him is the blueprint that's allowed me to have a career."  At the age of thirteen he became the youngest person ever to receive the Jury Prize at the 1994 Paris International Dance Competition. Although he was enrolled at Kirov in time for the 1996 Varna International Ballet Competition, the school had a policy of only sending dancers sure to win the gold.  So Thomas represented the Seiskaya School of Ballet of New York instead (with whom he was doing guest performances at the time) and Gerald Arpino, Arthur Mitchell and Debbie Allen sponsored him at a cost of $30,000.  At fifteen, he was awarded the Junior Gold Medal at the event, becoming the youngest ever to win and while on a foot he injured in karate class. After his win, The New York Times announced, "Look out, world.  Rasta Thomas has arrived."  In 1995, Thomas became a member of Le Jeune Ballet de France, and in 1997 was invited by the Hartford Ballet to be a principal artist.  At the 1998 USA International Ballet Competition, Thomas won the gold medal, a scholarship, and a cash prize in the senior men's division.

Professional career
In 1998, already a seasoned performer despite being a minor, he was permitted to perform in the senior division of the USA International Ballet Competition (USAIBC).  Thomas won the gold medal, and at 16 years old became the youngest to win in the senior division, beating Mikhail Baryshnikov's previous record age of 18.  The win opened up new opportunities for the dancer.  Later that year, he and three other dancers, including Adrienne Canterna, originated the piece for the tenth season of The Vail International Dance Festival.  The couple performed at the festival again in 1999.

Upon returning to the US, he went to Los Angeles to begin his commercial career: he hired an agent, danced in a GAP commercial and had a solo in the Debbie-Allen choreographed 1999 Academy Awards.  Thomas conceived and directed In Homage: A Tribute to Families With AIDS, a benefit for Self-Help Community Services and its Family Home Care program.  He was enjoying commercial success and popular recognition, but after a conversation with one of his mentors, Arthur Mitchell, he decided to "get back on an artist's path."

Thomas moved to New York City and joined the Dance Theatre of Harlem (under the tutelage of Mitchell) in what would prove to be their final season.  Instead of signing to another company, Thomas decided to become a guest dancer.  While Thomas was dining with choreographer Vladimir Angelov, a friend told Thomas that he was wasting his talent by only performing at galas.  Angelov agreed, remarking that excellent danseurs are expected to belong to premier companies.  Shortly after their dinner, Angelov introduced Thomas to Gerhard Rieder, who presents the Kirov Ballet in Europe, who in turn introduced Rasta to the Kirov's company manager, Makharbek Vaziev. Rieder invited Thomas to perform in Kirov's February 2001 three-hour gala in St. Petersburg. He performed a dance Angelov choreographed to "Flight of the Bumblebee," to rave reviews, including from Valery Gergiev, artistic director of the Kirov Ballet and Opera.  Vaziev invited Thomas to residency with the ballet and a stipend of $150 a month while granting him freedom accept independent work; Thomas declined due to a filming commitment in the movie Without a Word, so Vaziev extended his invitation to the fall.  Though Thomas enjoyed the filming experience he realized his dancing career was finite.  He decided to dance for six months in Russia with the Kirov Ballet. Rasta moved to St. Petersburg as the first American to become a member of the Kirov in October 2001.  While there, he most notably danced as Swan Lake's Jester, Carmen's bullfighter, and Le jeune homme et la mort's Young Man. Due to the companies internal politics Thomas became disenchanted and moved back to Maryland to February 2002. The following October, he carried the torch and performed in the opening ceremonies of USAIBC.

Thomas has appeared as a guest artist with such companies as 2000–Present: Dance Theater of Harlem, Washington Ballet, City Dance, Baryshnikov's White Oak Dance Company, Lar Lubovitch Dance Company, Loundin Ballet, Orlando Ballet, K Ballet, Alonzo King's Lines Contemporary Ballet Company, Complexions, DanceBrazil, Rafael Amargo Dance Company, Universal Ballet, Danza Contemporanea de Cuba, American Ballet Theater, Kirov Ballet, Pacific Northwest Ballet, etc. 1990-2000: Le Jeune Ballet de France, Joffrey Ballet, Maryland Youth Ballet, Arlington Dance Theater, Tulsa Ballet Theater, Victor Ullate, National Ballet of China, Hartford Ballet, Inoue Ballet, Philadanco, Imperial Russian Ballet.

Thomas danced in the ABT at the Metropolitan Opera House as a guest artist in a Lar Lubovitch production of Othello. He also played the role of Timmy in Patrick Swayze's 2005 DVD One Last Dance. In 2005, Thomas performed a solo in Lar Lubovitch's US debut of Elemental Brubeck.  Dance Magazine, in response to his performance, said "A creature of the stage, his presence is magnetic (if lacking nuance), and he relishes all the scrutiny he demands." NY Critic The New York Times said that the success of the piece can be credited to the "innate good taste and nuanced phrasing that informs Mr. Thomas's spectacular, crystal-clear performance."<ref>Sulcas, Roslyn (November 10, 2005), "Dance Review; A Leaping Man in Red, Propelled by Classic Brubeck". New York Times. That same year, he debuted on Broadway as the lead character Eddie in the hit musical Movin' Out and went on to work with the Movin' Out touring company. Thomas was featured on the winter 2006 cover of movmnt magazine. He choreographed and performed a well-received "stand-alone acrobatic ballet solo" for "Poetry in New York," a flamenco musical by Rafael Amargo.<ref>DUNNING, JENNIFER (June 26, 2006), "DANCE REVIEW; Using Flamenco to Evoke Lorca's Time in New York". New York Times. In late 2008, Thomas gathered several high-profile young dancers and invited them to judge an open video competition, where amateurs could enter a three-minute video of their solos via YouTube or divacompetition.com.<ref>Cann, Sara (November 2007), "BUZZ". Dance Spirit.  In July 2008, Thomas and 11 other gold-medal winners of previous USAIBC competitions were included in a one-night-only IBC Reunion Gala in Jackson, Mississippi.

“To me means artistic freedom. In this country you need fame to achieve your career goals to have people listen to your ideas and grant you money so that you can bring your artistic vision to life. The career is too short not to reach to great heights (June 2008), "Moving Pictures".Dance Magazine. The Dancer Within(2008) Thomas was interviewed for the book The Dancer Within: Intimate Conversations with Great Dancers by Rose Eichenbaum, a collection of interviews with prominent dancers. "Residing in the Body". Dance Magazine. The book accompanied Eichenbaum's touring photography exhibition, also called The Dancer Within, which sought to celebrate "the act of dancing and the lives of dancers.

Bad Boys of Dance
In 2007, Thomas founded the Bad Boys of Dance company (BBD). BBD selected dancers with strong technical backgrounds from competitions, Broadway, Juliard, etc. Their debut performance was at the Jacob's Pillow Dance Festival in July 2007. While initial critical response was mixed, the popular response was enthusiastic. After seeing one of their early performances, Jennifer Dunning of the New York Times called it "the dance equivalent of a water-bomb gang," remarked that Thomas's performance displayed "theatrical intelligence" and concluded that BBD "resembles a group of friends, gifted performers with individual presences who enjoy one another's company and blessedly have not an ounce of earnestness in them."<ref>Jennifer Dunning (July 31, 2007), "Dance Review – Bad Boys of Dance; A Troupe Keeps the Jinks Just as High as Possible". New York Times.

The summer of 2008, Rasta Thomas’ “Rock the Ballet” was created to showcase BBD. They made their international debut at the St. Pauli theater in Hamburg, Germany. In this show BBD incorporated jazz, hip hop, tap and gymnastics into ballet to some of today's most popular songs. Over the years BBD featured alumni of So You Think You Can Dance (including Craig DeRosa, Nick Lazzarini and Danny Tidwell). "The Bad Boys are Lookin' Good". Dance Spirit.

Since 2007, BBD has given over 1,000 performances, employed over 100 dancers and entertained over one million spectators world-wide. BBD opened the USAIBC ceremonies on June 12, 2010 "Jeté to Jackson".Dance Magazine. BBD has performed on Europe's and Australia's most celebrated stages. BBD has appeared on numerous TV shows in Germany, Switzerland, Austria, England, Japan, Italy etc. BBD had the honor of being featured in the documentary “Never Stand Still” with Suzanne Farrell, Paul Taylor, Merce Cunningham, Mark Morris and more narrated by Bill T. Jones. The documentary was released in selected theaters and later aired on PBS. BBD was invited to be cultural ambassadors for tours and workshops in India and Armenia both in association with the US State Department's, Art in the Embassies Program. BBD also starred in Rasta Thomas’ “Romeo and Juliet” and Rasta Thomas’ “Tap Stars”.

In 2014 the name Bad Boys of Ballet was used on behalf of Bad Boys of Dance on the ABCs America's Got Talent.

Personal life
Thomas has one daughter, Anami Halo Ramacandra (meaning "nameless angel of God") and was married to his long time dance partner, Adrienne Canterna.

Notes
Thomas’ endorsement deal with Capezio, a brand of dance apparel spanned 5 campaigns.

References

Footnotes

Bibliography
The Dancer Within: intimate Conversations with Great Dancers. Rose Eichenbaum, Aron Hirt-Manheimer Wesleyan University Press, 2008 ,  pp 188–190

Reviews
NY Times by Jennifer Dunning, July 31, 2007
NY Times by Roslyn Sulcas, December 16, 2009

External links
Rasta Thomas' website

Bad Boys of Dance website
Rasta Thomas, front cover, movmnt (magazine)
Archive footage of Rasta Thomas/BBD performing Heartbreak on Repeat in 2007 at Jacob's Pillow Dance Festival

American male ballet dancers
1981 births
Living people
Dance Theatre of Harlem dancers
People from San Francisco
Dancers from Washington, D.C.
Dancers from California